Graz University of Technology (short TU Graz) is one of five universities in Styria, Austria. It was founded in 1811 by Archduke John of Austria and is the oldest science and technology research and educational institute in Austria. It currently comprises seven faculties and is a public university. It offers 19 bachelors and 35 masters study programmes (of which 18 are in English) across all technology and natural science disciplines. Doctoral training is organised in 14 English-speaking doctoral schools. The university has more than 13,000 students, and approximately 2,000 students graduate every year. Science study programmes are offered in the framework of NAWI Graz together with the University of Graz.

The university has a staff of 3,912. Research areas are combined in five fields of expertise.

TU Graz, the University of Leoben and TU Wien form the network Austrian Universities of Technology (TU Austria) with more than 43,000 students and 10,000 staff.

Campus 
The university has multiple campuses, as it is mainly situated on three sites in the city, two in the centre of Graz and one in the southeast of the city.   
 Alte Technik (Rechbauerstrasse / Lessingstrasse)
 Neue Technik (Kopernikusgasse / Petersgasse)
 Inffeldgasse

Campus buildings at the Graz University of Technology

History 
1811: The Joanneum is founded by Archduke John of Austria. The first subjects taught were physics, chemistry, astronomy, mineralogy, botany, and technology, and
Friedrich Mohs was appointed first professor for mineralogy in 1812.

1864: The Styrian government makes it a Technische Hochschule.

1874: The Technische Hochschule is taken over by the state.

1888: Opening of the Main Building (Alte Technik) by Franz Joseph I of Austria.

1901: The Technische Hochschule is granted the right to award doctorates.

1955: It is divided into three faculties.

1975: It is divided into five faculties and renamed Technische Universität Graz, Erzherzog-Johann Universität (Graz University of Technology, Archduke-Johann-University).

2004: The new Austrian university law (UG 2002) is fully implemented – the university is divided into seven faculties.

Organization 
The university consists of seven faculties:
 Faculty of Architecture
 Faculty of Civil Engineering
 Faculty of Computer Science and Biomedical Engineering
 Faculty of Electrical and Information Medical
 Faculty of Mechanical Engineering and Economic Sciences
 Faculty of Mathematics, Physics and Geodesy
 Faculty of Technical Chemistry, Chemical and Process Engineering, Biotechnology

Teaching 
Students at TU Graz have a choice of 19 bachelor programmes and 35 master programmes. Graduates receive the academic degrees BSc, MSc or Diplom-Ingenieur/-in (Dipl.-Ing.). The doctoral programmes (Dr.techn. and Dr.rer.nat.) are offered as postgraduate programmes. Continuing education is offered in the framework of Lifelong Learning and consists of nine part-time master’s programmes and university programmes plus a range of other courses.

Facts and figures 
 Beginners: 1,800
 Graduates (academic year 2020/21): 1,865
 Federal budget 2021: €182.8 million
 Income from third-party funds 2021: €79.1 million
 Floor space (m2): 255,200
 Non-academic staff: 1,098
 Academic staff: 1,932 (of which project staff 1,083)
 Lecturers/student assistants: 884

Data from: 2021/22

Rankings 

In the 2019 Shanghai ranking of universities/Global Ranking of Academic Subjects, it is in the 101–150 range in Computer Science & Engineeringing and Electrical & Electronic Engineering, and in the 201–300 range in Biomedical Engineering, Materials Science & Engineering and Nanoscience & Nanotechnology. In the subjects Biotechnology, Chemical Engineering, Chemistry, Earth Sciences as well as Energy Science & Engineering, Graz University of Technology can be found in the 301–400 range. In Mathematics it is in the group 401–500. In the 2021 Leiden Ranking, the PPtop10% analysis puts it on position 279, the PPindustry ranks Graz University of Technology on place 23.

Notable alumni 
 Raimund Abraham (1933–2010), architect
 Silke Bühler-Paschen, physicist
 Günther Domenig (1934–2012), architect
 Friedrich Emich (1860–1940), chemist
 Dietmar Feichtinger (born 1961), architect
 Ernst Hiesmayr (1920–2006), architect, artist and former rector of the Technical University Vienna
 Karl Kordesch, fuel cell and battery designer
 Hans List, technical scientist and inventor, entrepreneur
 Hanns Malissa (1920–2010), chemist
 Hubert Petschnigg, architect
 Alois Riedler (1850–1936), mechanical engineer
 Rudolf Sanzin (1874–1922), locomotive designer
 Friedrich St. Florian (born 1932), architect
 Nikola Tesla, electrical and mechanical engineer, inventor (did not receive a degree and did not continue beyond the first semester of his third year, during which he stopped attending lectures)
 Karl von Terzaghi, civil engineer and founder of soil mechanics
 Luis Trenker (1892–1990), architect, artist and alpinist

Partnerships 
TU Graz has set up strategic partnerships with 7 universities:

 TU Darmstadt, Germany
 Nanyang Technological University, Singapore
 Peter the Great St. Petersburg Polytechnic University, Russia (activities currently suspended)
 Polytechnic University of Milan, Italy
 Technical University of Munich, Germany
 Tongji University, Shanghai, China
 University of Strathclyde, UK

Graz University of Technology is also a member of CESAER.

Affiliates and shareholdings 
TU Graz holds shares in more than 20 companies, mainly research centers like the Austrian Centre of Industrial Biotechnology or Virtual Vehicle. It also hosts the Austrian Centre for Electron Microscopy and Nanoanalysis and the headquarters of the Silicon Austria Labs.

See also
TU Austria
 International Conference of Physics Students

References

External links 

 
 TUGRAZonline (White pages, etc.)
 Alumni Union of TU Graz
 Library of the TU Graz
 Technology Exploitation Office of TU Graz
 Study in Austria: A Guide

 
Universities and colleges in Austria
Buildings and structures in Graz
Educational institutions established in 1811
Education in Styria
Education in Graz
1811 establishments in the Austrian Empire